Geogamasus is a genus of mites in the family Ologamasidae. There are more than 30 described species in Geogamasus.

Species
These 33 species belong to the genus Geogamasus:

 Geogamasus apophyseus Karg, 1976
 Geogamasus arcus Karg, 1976
 Geogamasus ardoris Karg, 1976
 Geogamasus bicirrus Karg, 1976
 Geogamasus bisetosus Karg, 1976
 Geogamasus brevisetosus Karg, 1997
 Geogamasus brevitondentis Karg, 1998
 Geogamasus cochlearis Karg, 1976
 Geogamasus coxalis (Sheals, 1962)
 Geogamasus cuneatus Karg, 1998
 Geogamasus delamarei (Sheals, 1962)
 Geogamasus diffindentis Karg, 1997
 Geogamasus fibularis Karg, 1976
 Geogamasus filicuspidis Karg, 1976
 Geogamasus flagellatus Karg, 1976
 Geogamasus foliaceus Karg, 1976
 Geogamasus forcipis Karg, 1976
 Geogamasus fornix Halliday, 2001
 Geogamasus furcatius Karg, 1976
 Geogamasus howardi Lee, 1970
 Geogamasus incisus Karg, 1976
 Geogamasus levispiritus Karg, 1998
 Geogamasus longifolii Karg & Schorlemmer, 2011
 Geogamasus longisetosus Karg, 1976
 Geogamasus minimus Lee, 1973
 Geogamasus monocuspidis Karg, 1976
 Geogamasus pentaspinosus Karg, 1979
 Geogamasus pisciformis Karg, 1997
 Geogamasus pugionis Karg, 1976
 Geogamasus reticulatus Karg, 1976
 Geogamasus skoshi Lee, 1970
 Geogamasus trispinosus Karg, 1976
 Geogamasus tuberosus Karg, 1976

References

Ologamasidae